The 1888 Chicago University club football team was an American football team that represented a club within the University of Chicago, composed of University Alumni who were still living in the area, in the 1888 college football season. Most of the team were businessmen who had played football on the Harvard, Yale, Princeton, and Columbia football teams. Chicago had yet to form an official collegiate football team, not doing so until the 1892 season.

Schedule

The contest against Harvard Prep on November 21 was seen as a practice game, and so the Harvard team doesn't recognize it

Roster
The roster for the Thanksgiving Day contest against Michigan consisted of:

 A. Farwell, right end
 Harry Hamlin, right tackle
 B. B. Lamb, right guard (captain)
 Peters, center
 Burke, left guard
 A. S. Bickham, left tackle
 Lockwood, left end
 P. Hamlin, quarterback
 W. Crawford, right halfback
 J. Wallerm left halfback
 J. Cowling, fullback
 Eldridge, substitute

References

Chicago University club
Chicago Maroons football seasons
Chicago University club football